George Hayward may refer to:

 George Hayward (MP), Member of Parliament (MP) for Bridgnorth
 George Hayward (rugby) (1887–1948), Welsh international rugby union forward
 George Hayward (American football), NFL official
 George W. Hayward (1840–1870), British explorer
 George S. L. Hayward (1894–1924), English World War I aerial observer

See also 
 George Haywood (1906–1992), English footballer
 George Heywood (1907–1985), English footballer